Jalan Langgar, Federal Route 256, is a federal road in Kedah, Malaysia. The Kilometre Zero of the Federal Route 256 is located at Langgar west junctions.

History
In 2012, the highway was gazetted as Federal Route 256.

Features
At most sections, the Federal Route 256 was built under the JKR R5 road standard, allowing maximum speed limit of up to 90 km/h.

List of junctions

References

Malaysian Federal Roads
Roads in Kedah